Arthur Ingram Goodwin (February 27, 1876 – June 19, 1943) was a Major League Baseball pitcher. In one career game, he had a 0–0 record with an 81.00 ERA. He threw right-handed.

Goodwin was born in Whiteley Township, Pennsylvania, and died in Franklin Township, Pennsylvania.

External links
Baseball Reference.com page

1876 births
1943 deaths
New York Highlanders players
Major League Baseball pitchers
Baseball players from Pennsylvania
Bradford Pirates players
Wilkes-Barre Coal Barons players
Utica Reds players
Albany Senators players
Schenectady Electricians players
Schenectady Frog Alleys players
Memphis Egyptians players
Mobile Sea Gulls players
Gulfport Crabs players
Vicksburg Hill Billies players
Syracuse Stars (minor league baseball) players
Binghamton Bingoes players
Bradford Drillers players